Caiapobrycon tucurui is a species of characin fish endemic to the Tocantins River basin in Brazil. This species is the only member of its genus and is named for the town of Tucuruí.

References

Characidae
Monotypic fish genera
Fish of South America
Fish of Brazil
Endemic fauna of Brazil
Fish described in 2000